Azem  is a given name. Notable people with the name include:

 Azem Galica (1889-1924), Albanian soldier
 Azem Hajdari (1963-1998), Albanian politician
 Azem Maksutaj (born 1975), Albanian kickboxer
 Azem Vllasi (born 1948), Kosovo Albanian politician

See also
Azem (disambiguation)
Azéma
Azeem
Asem (given name)

Albanian masculine given names
Hebrew masculine given names